The 2024 Indian general election in Himachal Pradesh is expected to be held in or before May 2024 to elect the 4 members of 18th Lok Sabha.

Parties and alliances







References

Himachal Pradesh
Indian general elections in Himachal Pradesh